Hakea acuminata is a shrub of the family Proteaceae native to Western Australia. A restricted species bearing clusters of white flowers with a green or pinkish tinge in late autumn to winter.

Description
Shiny rich green leaves have a yellow tinge at the base, are almost flat and partially whorled in the higher flowering branches. Leaves have one to three prominent longitudinal veins on both sides. The inflorescence has 16 to 24 flowers appearing in racemes in leaf axils. The perianth  is a cream-yellow and the style long and prominent. Fruit become corky as they age and have little or no beak. From May to October clusters of cream to pale yellow, ageing to pale pink blooms appear.

Taxonomy and naming
Hakea acuminata was first formally described by botanist Laurence Haegi in 1999 as part of the work Appendix: Hakea written by Haegi, W.R.Barker, R.M.Barker, and A.J.Wilson as published in Flora of Australia.

Distribution and habitat
This species is endemic to two small areas along the south coast in the Great Southern and Goldfields-Esperance regions of Western Australia between Ravensthorpe and Jerramungup. Grows  on undulating plains of shrub-mallee or heath in deep white sand or loamy soils over granite.

Conservation status
Hakea acuminata is classified as "Priority Two - Poorly Known", known from one or a few populations by the Government of Western Australia Department of Parks and Wildlife, meaning it is rare or near threatened, due to its restricted distribution.

References

aculeata
Eudicots of Western Australia
Plants described in 1999